It Ain't Safe No More... is the sixth studio album by American rapper Busta Rhymes. The album was released on November 26, 2002, by Flipmode Records and J Records. The album went Gold on January 6, 2003 – and has sold 605,000 copies as of December 5, 2007. It served as his final album for J.

Singles
The original version of "Make It Clap" (which features Spliff Star) was released as a promotional single on October 22, 2002. The remix version (which features another guest, Sean Paul) was later sent to radio as the album's official lead single on January 13, 2003.

"I Know What You Want" (which features Mariah Carey and Flipmode Squad) was released as the album's second single on March 17 of that same year. It peaked at number 3 in the United States, Australia, and the United Kingdom. Rhymes' previous single, "Make It Clap," had failed to reach the top forty on the U.S. Billboard Hot 100 chart. "I Know What You Want" stayed in the top forty for twenty-one weeks, and was ranked 17 on the Hot 100 2003 year-end chart. For Carey, it was a return to form after a string of unsuccessful singles, and it became one of her biggest hits in years. Columbia Records later included it on her first remix album The Remixes (2003) and the British and Japanese reissues of Carey's ninth studio album Charmbracelet (2002).

The plot line for the video for "I Know What You Want" was continued in the video for the 2021 single "Where I Belong", in which Rhymes collaborated again with Carey.

Track listing

Charts

Weekly charts

Year-end charts

Certifications

References

External links

Busta Rhymes albums
2002 albums
Albums produced by DJ Scratch
Albums produced by J Dilla
Albums produced by the Neptunes
Albums produced by Rick Rock
Albums produced by Swizz Beatz
Albums produced by True Master
J Records albums